Some Time Later is a 2018 Spanish-Portuguese absurdist comedy film directed by José Luis Cuerda which features an ensemble cast of actors and comedians. Set in the year 9177 and based on the eponymous novel by Cuerda, the film is billed as a "spiritual sequel" to the 1989 cult film Amanece, que no es poco. It is Cuerda's swan song before his death in 2020.

Plot 
It is about the year 9177 (one thousand years up or down) and only one building (and its suburbs) lasts from humankind. Society is divided between the elite inhabiting the building, and the 'unemployed' who live outside in shacks. The aforementioned social fabric begins to unravel after José María, an outer dweller, tries to sell a lemonade to the elite, prompting a social revolution.

Cast

Production 

The screenplay adapted the novel Tiempo después by José Luis Cuerda written in 2015, in turn based on a discarded screenplay from 1997. A group of comedians (including Edu Galán, Andreu Buenafuente, Berto Romero and Arturo Valls) created a group to unshelf the work and produce a film. Some of the crew duties were entrusted to Pau Esteve Birba (cinematography), Lucio Godoy (music), Emma Tusell (editing), Pepe Domínguez (art direction), Clara Bilbao (costume design) and Miguel Calvo (sound). Andreu Buenafuente and Arturo Valls took over production duties.

The film's main theme, "Tiempo después", is performed by Joaquín Sabina.

A joint Spanish-Portuguese co-production, the film was produced by Tiempo después AIE, Estela Films, Pólvora Films, Lanube Películas, El Terrat and Planar Gestão de Equipamentos Cinematográficos, with the participation of Atresmedia Cine, Entertaintment One, Movistar+, Junta de Comunidades de Castilla-La Mancha and Castilla-La Mancha Media.

Shooting took place in between the Castilla–La Mancha and the Community of Madrid regions and wrapped by December 2017. Shooting locations included  and Hontanar, in the province of Toledo.

The "dystopic" building in which the fiction is set is a mashup of two iconic 20th-century buildings located in Madrid: the Torres Blancas designed by  Javier Sáenz de Oiza and the Spanish Cultural Heritage Institute (aka the 'Crown of Thorns') by Fernando Higueras and Antonio Miró. Some of the indoor shots were filmed in Torres Blancas.

Release 

Some Time Later premiered at the San Sebastián International Film Festival (SSIFF) in September 2018. Distributed by eOne Films Spain, the film was theatrically released in Spain on 28 December 2018.

Accolades 

|-
| align = "center" | 2019 || 6th Feroz Awards || colspan = "2" | Best Comedy Film ||  || 
|}

See also 
 List of Spanish films of 2018
 List of Portuguese films of 2018

References

External links 
 Some Time Later at ICAA's Catálogo de Cinespañol

2019 comedy films
2010s Spanish-language films
Films shot in Castilla–La Mancha
Films shot in the Community of Madrid
Films shot in Madrid
Films shot in the province of Toledo
Films based on Spanish novels
Spanish comedy films
Portuguese comedy films
Films set in the future
Atresmedia Cine films
2010s Spanish films
Films directed by José Luis Cuerda